The Wyżnica is a river in east Poland at 42.5 km. Wyżnica has its source at Słodków Trzeci. It is a right tributary of Vistula near Józefów nad Wisłą.

See also 

 Rivers of Poland

Rivers of Poland
Rivers of Lublin Voivodeship